Julian Martrel "LilJuMadeDaBeat" Mason is an American record producer and songwriter. Mason is most known for his work with Megan Thee Stallion.

Production and songwriting credits

Credits are courtesy of Discogs, Tidal, Apple Music, Genius, and AllMusic.

Awards and nominations

References 

Living people
1992 births
Songwriters from Texas
African-American songwriters
Record producers from Texas
African-American record producers
American hip hop record producers
People from DeSoto, Texas